This is a list of digraphs used in various Latin alphabets. Capitalisation involves only the first letter (ch becomes Ch) unless otherwise stated (ij becomes IJ).

Apostrophe
 

 is used in the Wu MiniDict Romanisation for  when it appears in a dark or yin tone.

 is used in the Wu MiniDict Romanisation for dark 

 is used in the Wu MiniDict Romanisation for dark 

 is used in the Wu MiniDict Romanisation for dark 
 

A
 is used in Taa, where it represents the glottalized or creaky-voiced vowel .

It is also used in some English and Scots dialects, such as Northumbrian and Shetlandic, to represent . There is a ligature .

 is used in Irish, where it represents  between two "broad" (velarized) consonants, e.g. Gael  ('a Gael').
 In German,  is a variant of  found in some proper names or in contexts where  is unavailable. 
 In Dutch,  is an old spelling variant of the  digraph but now only occurs in names of people or (less often) places and in a few loanwords from Greek and Latin.
 In Revised Romanization of Korean,  is used for /ɛ/.

 is used in Taa, where it represents the breathy or murmured . In German and English it typically represents a long vowel .

 is used in many languages, typically representing the diphthong . In German, it represents  as in Kaiser (which derived from Latin caesar). In the Kernowek Standard orthography of Cornish, it represents , mostly in loanwords from English such as paint.

 is used in Portuguese for a stressed  before a consonant.

 is used in many languages to write a nasal vowel. In Portuguese it is used for  before a consonant, in French it represents , and in many West African languages it represents . In Breton this digraph represents .

 is used in Portuguese for a stressed  before a consonant.

It is alternately written .

 is used in Walloon, for the nasal vowel .

 is used in Lakhota for the nasal vowel 

In French, it is found in a few words such as paonne representing . In Malagasy, it represents , and in Piedmontese, . In Wymysorys, it represents  (also spelt ). In Mandarin Pinyin, this is used to represent .

 is used in Taa, for the pharyngealized vowel .

It occasionally represents the diphthong , as in flautist. Due to historical reasons, this is used to transcribe  in several Romanizations of Wu Chinese.

In French,  represents  or sometimes . It most frequently appears in the inflectional ending marking plurals of certain kinds of words like cheval ('horse')  or canal ('channel'), respectively having a plural in chevaux and canaux.

In Icelandic, it represents , and in Norwegian .

In the Kernowek Standard orthography of Cornish,  stands for long  or short , as in caul ('cabbage') or dauncya ('to dance').

 was used in French but has been replaced by the trigraph eau.

 is used in English in ways that parallel English , though it appears more often at the end of a word.
In Welsh,  represents the diphthong .

 is used in English in ways that parallel English , though it appears more often at the end of a word.

In French, it is usually used to represent /ɛj/ before a vowel (as in ayant) and /ɛ.i/ before a consonant (as in pays).

 is used to notate  in Hokkien Pe̍h-ōe-jī.

B
In Hungarian, it represents geminated . In English, doubling a letter indicates that the previous vowel is short (so bb represents ). In ISO romanized Korean, it is used for the fortis sound , otherwise spelled ; an example is hobbang. In Hadza it is the rare ejective . In several African languages it is implosive .

When not initial, it represents , as in abdicate.

 is used in transcriptions of Indo-Aryan languages for a murmured voiced bilabial plosive, and for equivalent sounds in other languages. In Juǀʼhoan, it's used for the similar prevoiced aspirated plosive . In the orthography used in Guinea before 1985,  was used in Pular (a Fula language) for the voiced bilabial implosive , whereas in Xhosa, Zulu, and Shona,  represents the implosive and  represents the plosive .
 

 is used in the General Alphabet of Cameroon Languages for the voiced labiodental affricate .

 is used in Shona for a whistled sibilant cluster .

C
English success, French occire, Spanish accidente (dialectally  or ); this is not the case of Italian, where a  before a front vowel represents a geminated , as in lacci . In Piedmontese and Lombard,  represents the  sound at the end of a word. In Hadza it is the glottalized click .

It is used for the click  in Naro, and in the Tindall orthography of Khoekhoe for the voiceless dental click .

 is used in several languages. See article.

 is used in the Italian for  before the non-front vowel letters . In Polish, it represents  whenever it precedes a vowel, and  whenever it precedes a consonant (or in the end of the word), and is considered a graphic variant of ć appearing in other situations. In Romanian, it represents . The digraph is found at the end of a word (deci, atunci, copaci) or before the letters a, o, or u (ciorba, ciuleandra); the  sound made by the letter c in front of the letters e or i becomes  in front of the three aforementioned vowels, making the addition of the letter i necessary.

 is used in Friulian for  such as in words cjocolate . It's also used in local orthographies of Lombard to represent  derived from Latin ⟨cl⟩.

The latter is the case with English tack, deck, pick, lock, and buck (compare backer with baker). In German,  indicates that the preceding vowel is short.
Old spelling: Säcke: Säk-ke ('sacks')
New spelling: Säcke: Sä-cke
Among the modern Germanic languages,  is used mainly in Alsatian, English, German, Luxembourgish, Scots, Swedish, and other West Germanic languages in Austria, Germany and Switzerland. Similarly,  is used for the same purpose in Afrikaans, Danish, Dutch, Icelandic, Norwegian, and other West Germanic languages in the Netherlands and Belgium. Compare the word nickel, which is the same in many of these languages except for the customary  or  spelling.  The word is nickel in English and Swedish, Nickel in German, and nikkel in Afrikaans, Danish, Dutch, Icelandic and Norwegian.
It was also used in the Tindall orthography of Khoekhoe for the voiceless dental click  (equivalent to ).

When not initial, it represents , as in acne.

 is used in Seri for a labialized velar plosive, .

 is used in the Hungarian for a voiceless postalveolar affricate, . Examples of words with cs include csak ('only'), csésze ('cup'), cső ('pipe'), csípős ('peppery').

When not initial, it represents , as in act.

In Nahuatl,  is used before a vowel, whereas  is used after a vowel.

In Middle English these were all replaced by Latin .

In Kashubian,  represents . In French and Catalan, historical  contracted to the ligature , and represents the sound . In Hungarian, it was formerly used for the sound , which is now written .

D
 is used in Naro for the click , and in Juǀʼhoan for the prevoiced ejective .

In Welsh,  represents a voiced dental fricative . In the ISO romanization of Korean, it is used for the fortis sound , otherwise spelled ; examples are ddeokbokki and bindaeddeok. In Basque, it represents a voiced palatal plosive , as in onddo, ('mushroom'). In several African languages it is implosive . Latin delta (ẟ, lowercase only) is represented by "dd" in Modern Welsh.

 is used in the Albanian, Swahili, and revived Cornish for the voiced dental fricative . The first examples of this digraph are from the Oaths of Strasbourg, the earliest French text, where it denotes the same sound  developed mainly from intervocalic Latin -t-.
In early traditional Cornish  (yogh), and later , were used for this purpose. Edward Lhuyd is credited for introducing the grapheme to Cornish orthography in 1707 in his Archaeologia Britannica.
In the pre-1985 orthography of Guinea,  was used for the voiced alveolar implosive  in Pular. It is currently written . In the transcription of Australian Aboriginal languages,  represents a dental stop, .
In addition,  is used in various romanization systems. In transcriptions of Indo-Aryan languages, for example, it represents the murmured voiced dental plosive , and for equivalent sounds in other languages. In Juǀʼhoan, it's used for the similar prevoiced aspirated plosive . In the romanization of Arabic, it denotes , which represents  in Modern Standard Arabic.

In Navajo, it represents , and in Xhosa it represents . In Hadza it is ejective .

 is used in Yélî Dnye for doubly articulated and nasally released .

 is used in Yélî Dnye for nasally released .

 is used in Yélî Dnye for doubly articulated .

 is used for the click  in Naro.

See . It is used in Fijian for 'ndr' nasalized.

 is used in Juǀʼhoan for the prevoiced ejective .

 is used in the General Alphabet of Cameroon Languages for the voiced dental affricate .

 is used in some Zapotecan languages for a voiced postalveolar fricative . In Juǀʼhoan it is used for the prevoiced uvularized plosive .

In Shona, it represents .

 is used in several languages, often to represent . See article.

 is used in the Polish for a voiced retroflex affricate  (e.g.  'jam').

 is used in Serbo-Croatian, Slovak, Lithuanian, and Latvian to represent . See article.

E

 is used in Taa, where it represents the glottalised or creaky vowel .

 is used in many languages. In English,  usually represents the monophthong  as in meat; due to a sound change that happened in Middle English, it also often represents the vowel  as in sweat. In Romanian, it represents the diphthong  as in beată ('drunk female'). In Irish,  represents  between a slender and a broad consonant. In Old English, it represents the diphthong .  is also the transliteration of the  rune of the Anglo-Frisian Futhorc.

 represents a long mid vowel in a number of languages. In English,  represents  as in teen. In Dutch and German,  represents  (though it is pronounced  in majority of northern Dutch dialects).

 is used in Taa for the murmured vowel . In the Wade-Giles transliteration of Mandarin Chinese, it is used for  after a consonant, as in yeh . In German,  represents , as in Reh.

 This digraph was taken over from Middle High German, where it represented . It usually represents a diphthong. In Modern German,  is predominant in representing , as in Einstein, while the equivalent digraph  appears in only a few words. See also I before e except after c. In southern and western Faroese dialects, it represents the diphthong , while in northern and eastern dialects, it represents the diphthong .

In Welsh,  represents . In Irish and Scottish Gaelic, it represents  before a slender consonant. In Dutch and Afrikaans,  represents . In French,  represents , as in seiche.

 is used In Hepburn romanization of the Japanese language to transcribe the sound .

 is used in Swedish in some short words, such as leja  or nej .

In French orthography, it can represent /ɑ̃/.

 is used in Portuguese for   before a consonant.

 is used in Portuguese for  before a consonant.

However, usually it represents two vowels, like  in leotard and galleon,  in stereo and,  in geodesy, and, uniquely,  in geoduck.

 is used in Taa for the pharyngealized vowel .

 is found in many languages, most commonly for the diphthong . Additionally, in English,  represents  as in neuter (  in yod-dropping accents); however, the eu in "maneuver/manoeuvre" always represents  even in most non yod-dropping accents. In German, it represents  as in Deutsch; and in French, Dutch, Breton, and Piedmontese, it represents . In Cornish, it represents either long  and short  or long  and short . In Yale romanization of Cantonese it represents , while in the Cantonese Romanisation, it represents . In Sundanese and Acehnese, it represents  as in beureum ('red'). In the Revised Romanization of Korean, it represents .

An exception is the pronunciation  in sew, leading to the heteronym sewer,('drain') vs sewer ('one who sews').

This distribution can also be written .

In Faroese, it represents the diphthong .

F
 which may be written as the single unit: ﬀ, is used in English and Cornish for the same sound as single , . The doubling is used to indicate that the preceding vowel is (historically) short, or for etymological reasons, in latinisms. Very rarely,  may be found word-initially in English, such as in proper names (e.g., Rose ffrench, Jasper Fforde). In Welsh,  represents , while  represents . In medieval Breton, vowel nasalisation was represented by a following . This notation was reformed during the 18th century, though proper names retain the former convention, which leads to occasional mispronunciation. For ﬀ as a single unit see: Typographic ligature and Unicode FB00 (U+FB00) in Latin script in Unicode and Unicode equivalence

This happens to be silent, so that  in Gaelic corresponds to no sound at all.

 in used in Nambikwara for a glottalized .

G
 is used in Uzbek to represent .

 is used in some African languages for a voiced labial-velar plosive, .

 is used in languages, such as Xhosa and Zulu, for the click .

 is used in French for  before  as in geôle .

In Central Alaskan Yup'ik, it represents . In Greenlandic , it represents . In the ISO romanization of Korean, it is used for the fortis sound , otherwise spelled  (e.g. ggakdugi). In Hadza it is ejective . In Italian,  before a front vowel represents a geminated , as in legge .

 is used in several languages. See article.

In Italian, it represents  before the non-front vowel letters .

 is used in Albanian for the voiced palatal plosive , though for Gheg speakers it represents . In the Arbëresh dialect, it represents the voiced velar plosive . In Norwegian and Swedish  represents  in words like gjorde ('did'). In Faroese, it represents . It is also used in the Romanization of Macedonian as a Latin equivalent of Cyrillic . Also, it's used in Friulian to represent  (whilst  is one of the pronunciations of the letter ⟨z⟩). It can be found in some local orthographies of Lombard to represent  derived from Latin ⟨gl⟩. Before the letter Đ was introduced into Gaj's Latin alphabet in 1878, the digraph ⟨gj⟩ had been used instead; and it remained in use till the beginning of the 20th century.

Between vowels, it simply represents , as in paradigmatic.

 is used in Latin, where it represented  in the classical period. Latin velar-coronal sequences like this (and also ) underwent a palatal mutation to varying degrees in most Italo-Western Romance languages.

In English,  represents  initially (see /gn/ reduction) and finally (i.e. gnome, gnu, benign, sign). When it appears between two syllables, it represents  (e.g. signal). In Norwegian and Swedish,  represents  in monosyllabic words like agn, and between two syllables, tegne. Initially, it represents , e.g. Swedish gnista .

It is one of several variants of the digraph , and is preserved in the name of the town of Sagñay, Philippines.

 is used in languages, such as Xhosa and Zulu, for the click . In the Taa language, it represents .

 is used in English, Spanish, French, Portuguese and Catalan for  before front vowels  ( in English and French) where a "soft g" pronunciation (English ; Spanish ; French, Portuguese and Catalan ) would otherwise occur. In English, it can also be used to represent .

 is used in Spanish and Catalan for  before front vowels  where the digraph  would otherwise represent .

In the General Alphabet of Cameroon Languages it is used for the labialized fricative  .

 is used in languages, such as Xhosa and Zulu, for the click .

 is used in Hungarian for a voiced palatal plosive . In Hungarian, the letter's name is gyé. It is considered a single letter, and acronyms keep the digraph intact. The letter appears frequently in Hungarian words, such as the word for "Hungarian" itself: magyar.

 is used in Juǀʼhoan for the voiced alveolar click .

 is used in Juǀʼhoan for the voiced dental click .

 is used in Juǀʼhoan for the voiced lateral click .

 is used in Juǀʼhoan for the voiced palatal click .

H
 is used in Xhosa to write the murmured glottal fricative , though this is often written h. In the Iraqw language, hh is the voiceless epiglottal fricative , and in Chipewyan it is a velar/uvular .

In Icelandic it is used to denote .

See also reduction of Old English /hl/.

 is used in the Romanized Popular Alphabet used to write Hmong, where it represents the sound .

 is used in the Romanized Popular Alphabet used to write Hmong, where it represents the sound . It is also used in Icelandic to denote the same phoneme. See also reduction of Old English /hn/.

See also reduction of Old English /hr/.

 is used in the Wade-Giles transcription of Mandarin Chinese for the sound , equivalent to Pinyin x.

 is used primarily in the Classical Nahuatl language, in which it represents the  sound before a vowel; for example, Wikipedia in Nahuatl is written Huiquipedia. After a vowel,  is used. The sequence hu is also found in Spanish words such as huevo or hueso; however, in Spanish this is not a digraph but a simple sequence of silent h and the vowel u.

In the General Alphabet of Cameroon Languages it is used for the supposed fricative .

In its descendants in modern English, it is now spelled  (see there for more details).

 is used in Hepburn romanization of the Japanese language to transcribe the sound , which is the syllable hi before a y-vowel, such as hya, hyu, and hyo, which appear in Chinese loanwords.

I
 is used in Taa to represent the glottalized or creaky vowel .

 is used in Irish for the diphthong .

 is used in English, where it usually represents the  sound as in pries and allied or the  sound as in priest and rallied.

In Dutch and Afrikaans,  represents the tense vowel . In German, it may represent the lengthened vowel  as in Liebe (love) as well as the vowel combination  as in Belgien (Belgium). In Old English  was one of the common diphthongs, the umlauted version of "ea" and "eo". Its value is not entirely clear, and in Middle English it had become /e/.

, is used in Taa to represent the breathy or murmured vowel . It is also used in Tongyong Pinyin and Wade-Giles transcription for the fricative vowels of Mandarin Chinese, which are spelled i in Hanyu Pinyin.

See article.

 is used in Portuguese for  before a consonant.

 is used in many languages to write a nasal vowel.

 is used in Portuguese for  before a consonant.

 is used in French to write a vowel sound  that was once followed by a historical s, as in vous vîntes  "you came".

 is used in Lakhota for the nasal vowel .

 is used in Taa to represent the pharyngealized vowel .

In Mandarin pinyin, it is  after a consonant. (In initial position, this is spelled you.)

J
In Tongyong pinyin, it represents , written zh in standard pinyin. Jh is also the standard transliteration for the Devanāgarī letter झ .

In romanized Korean, it represents the fortis sound . In Hadza it is ejective .

 is used as a letter of the Seri alphabet, where it represents a labialized velar fricative, . It is placed between J and L in alphabetical order.

K
For instance, the Kalahari is spelled Kgalagadi  in Setswana.

, in transcriptions of Indo-Aryan and Dravidian languages, represents the aspirated voiceless velar plosive. For most other languages,  it represents the voiceless velar fricative , for example in transcriptions of the letter  in standard Arabic, standard Persian, and Urdu, Cyrillic Х, х (kha), Spanish j, as well as the Hebrew letter kaf in instances when it is lenited. When used for transcription of the letter  in Sephardic Hebrew, it represents the voiceless pharyngeal fricative . In Canadian Tlingit it represents , which in Alaska is written k.

See also . In Faroese, it represents .

 is used in Yélî Dnye doubly articulated and nasally released .

 is used in English to write the word-initial sound  (formerly pronounced /kn/) in some words of Germanic origin, such as knee and knife. It is used in Yélî Dnye for nasally released .

 is used as a letter in some African languages, where it represents a voiceless labial-velar plosive .

It also had that value in the Ossete Latin alphabet.

Used informally in English for phonemic spelling of qu, as in kwik (from quick), ultimately from Proto-Indo-European .

 in used in Nambikwara for a glottalized , and in Juǀʼhoan for the ejective .

L
, in Occitan, Gallo, and Portuguese, represents a palatal lateral approximant . In many Indigenous languages of the Americas it represents a voiceless alveolar lateral fricative . In the transcription of Australian Aboriginal languages it represents a dental lateral, . In Tibetan, it represents the voiceless alveolar lateral approximant , as in Lhasa.

 is a letter in some Slavic languages, such as the Latin orthographies of Serbo-Croatian, where it represents a palatal lateral approximant . For example, the word ljiljan is pronounced . Ljudevit Gaj first used the digraph  in 1830; he devised it by analogy with a Cyrillic digraph, which developed into the ligature . In Swedish it represents /j/ such as in Ljus.
While there are dedicated Unicode codepoints, U+01C7 (Ǉ), U+01C8 (ǈ) and U+01C9 (ǉ), these are included for backwards compatibility (with legacy encodings for Serbo-Croatian which kept a one-to-one correspondence with Cyrillic Љљ) and modern texts use a sequence of Basic Latin characters.

See article.

 is used in Asturian for a sound that was historically  but which is now an affricate, .

 is used in Yélî Dnye for doubly articulated .

 in used in Nambikwara for a glottalized .

 is used in Hungarian. See article.

M
'boat'). The Irish digraph is capitalized mB, for example  'in Dublin'. In English, mb represents  when final, as in lamb (see reduction of /mb/).

 is used in Yélî Dnye for doubly articulated and prenasalized .

It is used in Yélî Dnye for doubly articulated and prenasalized .

'mother'). 'head'). In Shona, Juǀʼhoan and several other languages, it is used for a murmured . In several languages, such as Gogo, it's a voiceless .

 is used in the Romanized Popular Alphabet used to write Hmong, where it represents the sound .

 is used in Haida (Bringhurst orthography) for glottalized .

 is used in English to write the word-initial sound  in a few words of Greek origin, such as mnemonic.

In Mpumpong of Cameroon,  is a plain .

 is used in Juǀʼhoan for a pharyngealized or perhaps creaky .

 is used in Yélî Dnye for doubly articulated and prenasalized .

 is used in Nambikwara for a glottalized .

N
Since  is not a letter in either language,  is not technically a digraph.

 is used in various alphabets. In the Romanized Popular Alphabet used to write Hmong, it represents the sound . In Xhosa and Zulu it represents the click .

In this function it is capitalized , e.g. i nDoire "in Derry".

, in Sino-Tibetan languages, as in English and several other European and derived orthographies (for example Vietnamese), generally represents the velar nasal . It is considered a single letter in many Austronesian languages (Māori, Tagalog, Tongan, Gilbertese, Tuvaluan, Indonesian, Chamorro), Welsh, and Rheinische Dokumenta, for velar nasal ; and in some African languages (Lingala, Bambara, Wolof) for prenasalized .

For the development of the pronunciation of this digraph in English, see NG-coalescence and G-dropping.

Finnish  uses the digraph 'ng' to denote the phonemically long velar nasal  in contrast to 'nk' , which is its "strong" form under consonant gradation, a type of lenition. Weakening  produces an archiphonemic "velar fricative", which, as a velar fricative does not exist in Standard Finnish, is assimilated to the preceding , producing . (No  is involved at any point, despite the spelling 'ng'.) The digraph 'ng' is not an independent letter, but it is an exception to the phonemic principle, one of the few in standard Finnish.

In this function it is capitalized nG, e.g. i nGaillimh "in Galway".

In Tagalog and other Philippine languages, ng represented the prenasalized sequence  during the Spanish era. The velar nasal, was written in a variety of ways, namely "n͠g", "ñg", "gñ" (as in Sagñay), and—after a vowel—at times "g̃".  During the standardization of Tagalog in the early part of the 20th century, ng became used for the velar nasal , while prenasalized  came to be written ngg. Furthermore, ng is also used for a common genitive particle pronounced , to differentiate it from an adverbial particle nang.

In Uzbek, it is considered as a separate letter, being the last (twenty-ninth) letter of the Uzbek alphabet. It is followed by the apostrophe (tutuq belgisi).

 is used in Central Alaskan Yup'ik to write the voiceless nasal sound .

, or more precisely , was a digraph in several Spanish-derived orthographies of the Pacific, such as Tagalog and Chamorro, where it represented the sound , as opposed to ng, which originally represented . An example is Chamorro agan͠gñáijon (modern agangñaihon) "to declare". Besides ñg, variants of n͠g include gñ (as in Sagñay), ng̃, and a g̃, that is preceded by a vowel (but not a consonant).

Since  is not a letter in Swahili,  is technically a digraph, not a trigraph.

 is used in several languages. See article.

 in Polish, it usually represents  whenever it precedes a vowel, and  whenever it precedes a consonant (or in the end of the word), and is considered a graphic variant of ń appearing in other situations. (In some cases it may represent also  before a vowel; for a better description, when, see the relevant section in the article on Polish orthography).

 is a letter in the Latin orthographies of Albanian, Serbo-Croatian. Ljudevit Gaj, a Croat, first used this digraph in 1830. In all of these languages, it represents the palatal nasal . For example, the Croatian and Serbian word konj (horse) is pronounced . The digraph was created in the 19th century by analogy with a digraph of Cyrillic, which developed into the ligature . While there are dedicated Unicode codepoints, U+01CA (Ǌ), U+01CB (ǋ) and U+01CC (ǌ), these are included for backwards compatibility (with legacy encodings for Serbo-Croatian which kept a one-to-one correspondence with Cyrillic Њњ) and modern texts use a sequence of Basic Latin characters.

In Faroese, it generally represents , although in some words it represent , like in banjo. In Malagasy, it represents .

In the transcription of Australian Aboriginal languages such as Warlpiri, Arrernte, and Pitjantjatjara, it distinguishes a prenasalized velar stop, from the nasal .

 is used in Yélî Dnye for doubly articulated .

 is used in Yélî Dnye for doubly articulated .

In Spanish historical  has contracted to the ligature  and represents the sound . It is used in Haida (Bringhurst orthography) for glottalized .

 is used in the Romanized Popular Alphabet used to write Hmong, where it represents the sound .

 is used in various alphabets. In the Romanized Popular Alphabet used to write Hmong, it represents the sound . In Xhosa and Zulu it represents the click .

 is used in the Romanized Popular Alphabet used to write Hmong, where it represents the sound .

 is used for the click  in Xhosa and Zulu, and in Nambikwara for a glottalized .

See article.

, in many African languages, represents  ~ ,  ~ ,  ~ , or  ~ .

 is used in Juǀʼhoan for the alveolar nasal click .

 is used in Juǀʼhoan for the dental nasal click .

 is used in Juǀʼhoan for the lateral nasal click .

 is used in Juǀʼhoan for the palatal nasal click .

 is used for medial  in Piedmontese.

O
Technically it is not a digraph in Uzbek, since  is not a letter of the Uzbek alphabet, but rather a typographic convention for a diacritic.

It is also used in Taa, for the glottalized or creaky vowel .

 is used in English, where it commonly represents the  sound as in road, coal, boast, coaxing, etc. In Middle English, where the digraph originated, it represented , a pronunciation retained in the word broad and derivatives, and when the digraph is followed by an "r", as in soar and bezoar. The letters also represent two vowels, as in koala , boas , coaxial , oasis , and doable .

 is found in many languages. In English, it represents the  sound as in hoe and sometimes the  sound as in shoe.

 is used in French to write the vowel sound  in a few words before what had historically been an s, mostly in words derived from   "stove".

 is used in Afrikaans for the vowel .

 is used in Taa, for the breathy or murmured vowel .

 is used in various languages. In English, oi represents the  sound as in coin and join. In French, it represents , which was historically – and still is in some cases – written "oy."

 is used in French to write  before what had historically been an s, as in boîtier or cloître.

 is used in Brazilian Portuguese for  before a consonant.

 is used in Portuguese for  before a consonant, and in French to write .

 is used in Portuguese for  before a consonant.

It is alternately written oin.

 is used in many languages. In English, oo commonly represents sounds which historically descend from the Middle English pronunciation . After the Great Vowel Shift, this came to typically represent  as in "moon" and "food". Subsequently, in a handful of common words like "good" and "flood" the vowel was shortened to /u/, and after the Middle English – split, these became  and  respectively. In German and Dutch, the digraph represents .

 Is used in Taa,for the pharyngealized vowel .

, in Daighi tongiong pingim, represents mid central vowel  or close-mid back rounded vowel  in Taiwanese Hokkien.

 is used in English for the diphthong , as in out . This spelling is generally used before consonants, with  being used instead before vowels and at the ends of words. The ou in out originally represented , as in French, and its pronunciation has mostly changed as part of the Great Vowel Shift. However, the  sound was kept before p.

In French, it represents the vowel , as in vous  "you", or the approximant consonant , as in oui  "yes".

In Portuguese this digraph stands for the close-mid back rounded vowel  or for the falling diphthong , according to dialect.

 is used In Hepburn romanization of the Japanese language to transcribe the sound .

 is used in French to write the vowel sound  before what had historically been an s, as in soûl  "drunk" (also spelt soul).

, in English, usually represents the  sound as in coward, sundowner, and now or the  sound, as in froward, landowner, and know. There are many English heteronyms distinguished only by the pronunciation of this digraph, like: bow (front of ship or weapon), bower (a dwelling or string player), lower (to frown or drop), mow (to grimace or cut), row (a dispute or line-up), shower (rain or presenter), sow (a pig or to seed), tower (a building or towboat).

This distribution can also be written .

 is found in many languages. In English and Faroese, oy represents the diphthong . Examples in English include toy and annoy. In Cornish, it represents the diphthong ; in the words oy ('egg') and moy ('much'), it can also be pronounced .

 is an obsolete digraph once used in French.

P

 in German represents a labial affricate . It can be initial (Pferd, 'horse'), medial (Apfel, 'apple'), or final (Knopf, 'button'). Where it appears in English, usually in names or words recently derived from German, it is ordinarily simplified to  such as Pfizer.

, in English and some other languages, represents , mostly in words derived from Greek. The Greek pronunciation of  later changed to /f/, and this was also the sound adopted in other languages for the relevant loanwords. Exceptionally, in English,  represents   in the name Stephen and some speakers' pronunciations of nephew.

 is used in the Romanized Popular Alphabet used to write Hmong, where it represents the sound .

 is used in English for an initial sound  in words of Greek origin such as pneumatic. When not initial, it represents the sequence , as in apnea.

 is used in English for an initial sound  in words of Greek origin such as psyche. When not initial, it represents the sequence , as in ellipse. It is also used in Shona to write a whistled sibilant cluster .

An example in English is pterosaur , and an exception is ptarmigan , which is Gaelic, not Greek. When not initial, pt represents the sequence , as in apt.

Q
 is used to write the click  in Naro. It was used in the Tindall orthography of Khoekhoe for the voiceless alveolar click .

 is used in various alphabets. In Quechua and the Romanized Popular Alphabet used to write Hmong, it represents the sound . In Xhosa, it represents the click .

 was used in the Tindall orthography of Khoekhoe for the voiceless alveolar click  (equivalent to ).

 is used in Haida (Bringhurst orthography) for ejective . In Hadza it is the glottalized click .

This dates to Latin qu, and ultimately the Proto-Indo-European labialized velar consonant ; in English this sound instead became written primarily as wh, due to Grimm's law changing  >  (written hw), and Middle English spelling change switching hw to wh. In German, where the /w/ sound evolved into /v/, it is used to represent /kv/ in both native Germanic words and Latin borrowings. In Cornish, it represents the  sound.

 is used for glottalized  in Bouyei.

 is used in some languages for the sound .

 is used for glottalized  in Bouyei.

R
 is used in the transcription of Australian Aboriginal languages such as Warlpiri, Arrernte, and Pitjantjatjara for a retroflex stop, . In Norwegian and Swedish it represents voiced retroflex plosive, .

 is used in English for Greek words transliterated through Latin. Examples include "rhapsody", "rhetoric" and "rhythm". These were pronounced in Ancient Greek with a voiceless "r" sound, as in Old English . The digraph may also be found within words, but always at the start of a word component, e.g., "polyrhythmic". German, French, and Interlingua use rh in the same way.  is also found in Welsh where it represents a voiceless alveolar trill, that is a voiceless "r" sound. It can be found anywhere; the most common occurrence in English from Welsh is in the slightly respelled given name "Rhonda". In Wade-Giles transliteration,  is used for the syllable-final rhotic of Mandarin Chinese. In Purépecha, it is a retroflex flap, .

 is used in the transcription of Australian Aboriginal languages such as Warlpiri, Arrernte, and Pitjantjatjara, as well in Norwegian and Swedish, for a retroflex lateral, written  in the IPA. In Greenlandic, it represents  as the result of an assimilation of a consonant cluster with a uvular consonant as the first component.

 represents the retroflex nasal  in Warlpiri, Arrernte, and Pitjantjatjara (see transcription of Australian Aboriginal languages), as well in Norwegian and Swedish. In Greenlandic, it represents . In Inuktitut, it represents .

It normally appears in words of Latin or Romance origin, and "rrh" in words of ancient Greek origin. It is quite a common digraph. Some words with "rr" are relatively recent loanwords from other languages; examples include burro from Spanish. It is often used in impromptu pronunciation guides to denote either an alveolar tap or an alveolar trill. It is a letter in the Albanian alphabet.

In several European languages, such as Catalan, Spanish, Portuguese or Albanian, "rr" represents the alveolar trill  (or the voiced uvular fricative  in Portuguese) and contrasts with the single "r", which represents the alveolar tap  (in Catalan and Spanish a single "r" also represents the alveolar trill at the beginning of words or syllables). In Italian and Finnish, "rr" is a geminated (long) consonant .

In Greenlandic, it represents  as the result of an assimilation of a consonant cluster with a uvular consonant as the first component. In Norwegian and Swedish, it represents voiceless retroflex fricative, .

 is used in Australian Aboriginal languages such as Warlpiri, Arrernte, and Pitjantjatjara, as well in Norwegian and Swedish, for a retroflex stop .

 is used in Polish and Kashubian for a voiced retroflex fricative , similar to English zh as in Zhivago.

S
 is used in Italian for  before the front vowel letters e, i. However, it represents  in modern pronunciations of crescent in British and non-Canadian Commonwealth English. In Old English it usually represented .

It is also used in Portuguese as in the imperative/conjunctive form of verbs ending with scer: crescer cresça.

 is used in several languages. In English, it represents . See separate article. See also ſh below, which has the capitalized forms SH and ŞH.

In Polish, it represents  whenever it precedes a vowel, and  whenever it precedes a consonant (or in the end of the word), and is considered a graphic variant of ś appearing in other situations. In Welsh  is used for the sound  as in siocled  ('chocolate').

 is used Swedish to write the sje sound  (see also ) and in Faroese, Danish, Norwegian and Dutch to write Voiceless postalveolar fricative .

 is used in Swedish to write the sje sound . It takes by rule this sound value before the front vowels (e, i, y, ä and ö) word or root initially (as in sked (spoon)), while normally representing  in other positions. In Norwegian and Faroese, it is used to write voiceless postalveolar fricative  (only in front of i, y, ei and øy/oy).

 is used in Iraqw and Bouyei to write the lateral fricative . (Sl is used in the French tradition to transcribe  in other languages as well, as in the General Alphabet of Cameroon Languages.)

For its use in the Wade–Giles system of Romanization of Chinese, see Wade–Giles → Syllabic consonants. In English,  typically represents  in the first ss of possess and its derivatives possessed, possesses, possession, possessive and  possessor, brassiere, dessert, dissolution and its derivatives dissolved, dissolves and dissolving, Missoula (County), Missouri(an), scissors, and pronunciations of Aussie outside the United States. In romanized Korean, it represents the fortis sound .

In some parts of northern Germany, the pronunciation  (as in English) is still quite common in the local dialect.

 is used in Shona to write the whistled sibilant . This was written ȿ from 1931 to 1955.

 is used to write the sound  in Malay and Tagalog.

 is used in several languages. See article.

T
 is used for the palatal click  in Naro, and to write the affricate  in Sandawe, Hadza and Juǀʼhoan.

 is used in the General Alphabet of Cameroon Languages for the voiceless dental affricate 

In Catalan, it represents .

 is used in several languages. See article. See also: Pronunciation of English th.

In the closely related Swedish alphabet, it represents , as in tjära . It is also the standard written form of the  sound in Dutch and was likewise used in Dutch-based orthographies that used to apply for languages in Indonesia and Surinam. In Catalan it represents . 
In Juǀʼhoan it is used for the ejective affricate .

 is used in Juǀʼhoan for the uvularized ejective .

 is used in various orthographies for the affricate .

 is used in Yélî Dnye for doubly articulated and nasally released .

 is used for a prestopped nasal  in Arrernte, and for the similar  in Yélî Dnye.

 is used in Yélî Dnye for doubly articulated .

 generally represents a sound like a retroflex version of English "ch" in areas of German influence, such as Truk lagoon, now spelled . For instance, in Malagasy it represents . In southern dialects of Vietnamese,  represents a voiceless retroflex affricate . In the northern dialects, this sound is pronounced , just like what  represents.  was formerly considered a distinct letter of the Vietnamese alphabet, but today is not.

 is used in the Basque, where it represents an apical voiceless alveolar affricate . It is mainly used to latinize the letter Tse (Cyrillic) (ц) In  Hausa,  represents an alveolar ejective fricative  or affricate ), depending on dialect. It is also used in Hausa Boko.

The Wade-Giles and Yale romanizations of Chinese use  for an unaspirated voiceless alveolar affricate . Wade-Giles also uses  for the aspirated equivalent . The Hepburn romanization of Japanese uses  for a voiceless alveolar affricate ). In native Japanese words, this sound only occurs before , but it may occur before other vowels in loanwords. It occurs word-initially only in some loanwords, such as tsunami and tsar.

In romanized Korean, it represents the fortis sound , in Haida (Bringhurst orthography) it is ejective , and in Cypriot Arabic, it represents .

 is used in Basque, Catalan and some indigenous languages of South America, for a voiceless postalveolar affricate . In  Nambikwara it represents a glottalized . In Juǀʼhoan it is used for the uvularized-release .

In Xhosa,  represents  and the similar  in the Algonquian Massachusett orthography. In  Shona, it represents . In Tagalog it represents . In the transcription of Australian Aboriginal languages such as Warlpiri, and Arrernte, it represents a postalveolar stop, either voiceless  or voiced . In Cypriot Arabic, it represents .

 is used in Basque, German and Nahuatl for the voiceless alveolar affricate ). It is also used in Catalan to represent the voiced alveolar affricate . 
In Juǀʼhoan it is used for the ejective affricate .
For its use in the Wade–Giles system of Romanization of Chinese, see Wade–Giles → Syllabic consonants.

U
 is used in Taa for the glottalized or creaky vowel .

 is used in Nahuatl for  before a consonant. Before a vowel,  is used.

 is found in many languages. In English,  represents /ju/ or /u/ as in cue or true, respectively. In the Cantonese Romanisation, it represents  in a non-initial position.

 is used in Afrikaans to represent .

 is used in Taa for the breathy or murmured vowel . In Nahuatl, it is used for  before a consonant. Before a vowel,  is used.

 in Dutch stands for the diphthong . In German, it represents the diphthong , which appears only in interjections such as "pfui!". In English, it represents the sound  in fruit, juice, suit and pursuit. However, in many English words, this does not hold. It represents /ai/ in guide. In Mandarin pinyin, it is  after a consonant. (In initial position, this is spelled wei.) In French, it is not a digraph, but a predictable sequence , as in huit "eight". In Scots it represents the vowel in words such as bluid (blood), duin (done), muin (moon) and spuin (spoon) and is used similarly in Northumbrian and Cumbrian.

 is used in Portuguese for  before a consonant.

 is used in many languages to write a nasal vowel. In pinyin,  is spelled un after a consonant, wen initially.

 is used in Portuguese for  before a consonant.

 is used in Lakhota for the nasal vowel .

 is used in Taa, for the pharyngealized vowel .

In languages with phonemic long vowels, it may be used to write .

 (a split digraph) indicates an English 'long u', historically , also .

V
 is used in the General Alphabet of Cameroon Languages for the labiodental flap .

 was used in the Tindall orthography of Khoekhoe for the voiceless palatal click .

 represents  in Shona. It was also used in the Tindall orthography of Khoekhoe for the aspirated palatal click .

 was used in the Tindall orthography of Khoekhoe for the voiceless palatal click  (equivalent to ).

 was used in the Tindall orthography of Khoekhoe for the palatal nasal click .

 is used in Quechua.

W
 is used in English to represent Proto-Germanic , the continuation of the PIE labiovelar  (which became  in Latin and the Romance languages). Most English question words begin with this digraph, hence the terms wh-word and wh-question. In most dialects it is now pronounced , but a distinct pronunciation realized as a voiceless w sound, [ʍ], is retained in some areas: Scotland, central and southern Ireland, the southeastern United States, and (mostly among older speakers) in New Zealand. In a few words (who, whose, etc.) the pronunciation used among almost all speakers regardless of geography is /h/. For details, see Pronunciation of English ⟨wh⟩.
In the Taranaki region, for some speakers, this represents a glottalized . In Xhosa, it represents , a murmured variant of  found in loan words. In Cornish, it represents .

 is used in English for words which formerly began , now reduced to /r/ in virtually all dialects.

 is used in Mandarin pinyin to write the vowel  in initial position, as in the name Wuhan. It is sometimes found with this value in Romanized Korean as well, as in hanwu.

 is used in Haida (Bringhurst orthography) for glottalized .

 is used in Nambikwara for a glottalized .

X
 is used in the General Alphabet of Cameroon Languages for the labialized fricative .
 
 is used to write the click  in Naro. It was used in the Tindall orthography of Khoekhoe for the voiceless lateral click .
 
, in Albanian, represents the sound of the voiced postalveolar affricate consonant , as in the surname Hoxha . In Zulu and Xhosa it represents the voiceless aspirated alveolar lateral click , for example in the name of the language Xhosa . In Canadian Tlingit it represents , which in Alaska is written x̱.
 
(It is equivalent to  plus the digraph , as in action.)
 
 was used in the Tindall orthography of Khoekhoe for the voiceless lateral click  (equivalent to ).
 
 is used as a letter of the Seri alphabet, where it represents a labialized uvular fricative, . It is placed between X and Y in alphabetical order.
 
 is used in Portuguese in the word exsudar  in Brazilian Portuguese.
 
 
 
 
 
  is used in the Romanized Popular Alphabet used to write Hmong, where it represents the sound .

Y
 used in various languages. In some languages such as English  it is used as an  such as in bye or dye. In most languages,  it is used as an  sound, such as in yellow.

 was used in the pre-1985 orthography of Guinea, for the "ejective y" or palatalized glottal stop in Pular (a Fula language). In the current orthography it is now written ƴ. In Xhosa it is used for the sound . In a handful of Australian languages, it represents a "dental semivowel".

 is used in Mandarin pinyin to write the vowel  when it forms an entire syllable.

 is used in Yanyuwa for a pre-velar stop, .

 is used in French to write the vowel sound  ( before another vowel), as in thym  "thyme".

 is used in French to write the vowel sound  in some words of Greek origin, such as syncope  "syncope".

 is used in Pinyin to write the trilled vowel  in languages such as Yi.

 is used in romanized Chinese to write the vowel . (See jyu.)

 in used in Nambikwara for a glottalized .

 is used in some languages such as Finnish to write the long vowel . In Haida (Bringhurst orthography) it is glottalized .

 (a split digraph) indicates an English 'long y' (equivalent to ).

Z
In Hanyu Pinyin,  represents the voiceless retroflex affricate . When Malayalam and Tamil are transliterated into the Latin script,  represents a retroflex approximant (Malayalam ഴ and Tamil ழ, ḻ, [ɻ]).

 in Polish represents  whenever it precedes a vowel, and  whenever it precedes a consonant (or in the end of the word), and is considered a graphic variant of ź appearing in other situations.

 is used in the General Alphabet of Cameroon Languages for the voiced lateral fricative 

 is the last (forty-fourth) letter of the Hungarian alphabet.  Its name is "zsé" and represents , a voiced postalveolar fricative, similar to J in Jacques and s in vision. A few examples are rózsa "rose" and zsír "fat".

 is used in Shona to write the whistled sibilant . This was written ɀ from 1931 to 1955.

 is used in Dutch to represent the labialized voiced alveolar fricative.

It is also used with that value in romanized Kabyle. In Hadza it is ejective .

Other 

, capital , is used in many West African languages for the nasal vowel . Ɛ is an "open e".

, capital , is used in many West African languages for the nasal vowel . Ɔ is an "open o".

The first element of the digraph, œ, is itself is a ligature of o and e, and  may also be written as the trigraph .

 is used in the General Alphabet of Cameroon Languages for the labial-velar nasal .

 is used in Adzera for the prenasalized glottal stop .

The first element, the long s, is an archaic non-final form of the letter .

    are used in Juǀʼhoan for its four glottalized nasal clicks, .

    are used in Khoekhoe for its four tenuis clicks, .

    are used in Khoekhoe for its four aspirated nasal clicks, and in Juǀʼhoan for its plain aspirated clicks, .

    are used in Juǀʼhoan for its four affricate ejective-contour clicks, .

    are used in Khoekhoe for its four plain nasal clicks, .

    are used in Juǀʼhoan for its four affricate pulmonic-contour clicks, .

See also
 List of Latin-script trigraphs
 List of Latin-script tetragraphs
 Pentagraph
 Hexagraph
 Heptagraph
 List of Latin letters
 List of Cyrillic digraphs

References